Silex is a free WYSIWYG website builder, that can be used directly in a browser or run offline as a it also provides cross-platform application version. The application includes a drag and drop interface to edit a website, and HTML, CSS and JavaScript editors to add styles and interactivity to the elements.

History
 Founded in 2003 by Alex Hoyau, Pol Goasdoué and Pierre Teissière. The project is oriented towards video and cross media.
 In 2005, the version v0-6 is presented at the WWDC2005 in Cupertino California. Apple is interested in Flash capacity to compete with their QuickTime plug-in. Macromedia has just been acquired by Adobe, Apple's main partner.
 In 2006, the program was presented in several conferences at La Villette and won a challenge organized by Dauphine high school with INRIA - French National institute for research in computer science and control. The program at this time was mainly used for freelancers small projects.
 In 2007, Silex source code officially released as open source
 In 2008, Silex was among the 100 first Open Source projects on SourceForge. Silex v1 is released.
 In 2009, Silex was project of the month on SourceForge. The program was  presented Silex at several French conference: Futur en Seine, Les Trophées du Libre, Pas sage en Seine, Wikiplaza 
 In 2010, the team members  formalized their cooperation by creating a non profit organization for   promotion, deployment support, and   development of open source software projects related to Silex and Open Source Flash. The organization became the official maintainer of AMFPHP, a mature communautary project.
 In 2012, Silex has reached the 100.000 downloads. And the team has made a dedicated version for HTML, the html5 editor, which was downloaded 1000 times on the first month.
 In 2013, the team, led by Alex Hoyau  started from scratch and build Silex V2 with Javascript, Node.js and more modern technologies than the previous version.
 In 2016, Silex Labs foundation has set up a crowd funding campaign to give Silex international concern by creating a multilingual documentation and tutorials, and to create free templates to facilitate the creation of a website, and to develop a "responsive editor" to make it possible to optimize the mobile version of websites.

Features
 WYSIWYG environment to edit a publication with drag and drop
 HTML, CSS and Javascript code editors included
 Suitable for prototyping
 Web based (can be installed locally on a web server) or as a portable offline app
 Free templates and plugins
File browser integration with GitHub, Dropbox, FTP, WebDAV, and SFTP
Easy options for responsive element design
Easy switch between desktop and mobile view

References

External links
 
 https://www.hostscore.net/choose/wix-alternatives/

Content management systems
Web development software